Rick John Santelli (born July 6, 1956) is an editor for the CNBC Business News network. He joined CNBC as an on-air editor on June 14, 1999, reporting primarily from the floor of the Chicago Board of Trade. He was formerly the vice president for an institutional trading and hedge fund account for futures-related products.  He is also credited as being a catalyst in the early formation of the Tea Party movement via a statement he made on February 19, 2009.

Early life
The grandson of four Italian immigrants, Rick John Santelli was born near Taylor Street in Chicago's old Italian neighborhood and moved with his family to Lombard, Illinois at age six. After graduating from Willowbrook High School in Villa Park, Illinois, Santelli attended the University of Illinois at Urbana–Champaign, where he was a member of the Alpha Sigma Phi fraternity and graduated with a Bachelor of Science in economics in 1979.

Career

Financial
In 1979, he joined the Chicago Mercantile Exchange and the Chicago Board of Trade as a commodity trader and order filler for Drexel Burnham Lambert; he eventually became the Vice President of Interest Rate Futures and Options.

Media
In the 1990s, Santelli felt that the financial industry was changing in a way "not beneficial to me and my family", and accepted a full-time job with CNBC in 1999.

Controversies

"Chicago Tea Party" remarks
Santelli drew attention for his remarks made on February 19, 2009, about the Homeowners Affordability and Stability Plan, which was announced on February 18. While broadcasting from the floor of the Chicago Mercantile Exchange, Santelli accused the government of "promoting bad behavior", and raised the possibility of a "Chicago Tea Party". He suggested that individuals who knowingly obtained high-risk mortgages (and faced impending foreclosure as a consequence) were "losers". The Tea Party remark was credited by some as "igniting" the Tea Party movement as a national phenomenon.

Responses
Described as "Loquacious and self-aggrandizing" by media, Santelli's remarks were characterized as a rant. CNBC canceled Santelli's scheduled interview on The Daily Show with Jon Stewart on March 4, 2009.

Santelli later clarified his comments and addressed concerns that the event was staged.

On April 20, 2009, Santelli participated as a panel member in an Economic Leadership Forum hosted by the George Bush Presidential Library Foundation at Texas A&M University.

CNN.com reported that some compared Santelli to fictional reporter Howard Beale, the protagonist of the 1976 satirical film Network. Santelli said:

Santelli's comments garnered praise from libertarians. Mark R. Crovelli wrote:

Santelli has been condemned by the left; George Monbiot said "it is the most alarming example of cheap demagoguery you are likely to have seen." Paul Krugman claimed that:

COVID-19 virus remarks
In 2020, media reported that, after a series of stock declines driven by fears of a COVID-19 virus pandemic, Santelli stated, during a live broadcast of The Santelli Exchange, on March 5, that "maybe we’d be just better off if we gave [the virus] to everybody, and then in a month it would be over because the mortality rate of [COVID-19] probably isn’t going to be any different if we did it that way than [in] the long-term picture, but the difference is we’re wreaking havoc on global and domestic economies." Santelli subsequently apologized for making the “dumbest, most ignorant” remarks about managing the COVID-19 pandemic.

Santelli was, again, criticized by media outlets, following his launch of a shouting match with CNBC news anchor Andrew Ross Sorkin, on December 4, 2020, over current government recommendations and legal measures directing individuals in order to curtail the COVID-19 pandemic. Santelli's rant against restrictions was repeatedly met by Sorkin, who asserted that science opposed Santelli's views, and deemed his diatribe "a disservice to the viewer."

Personal life
Since 2015, Santelli has lived with his wife in Wayne, Illinois.

References

External links
 Rick Santelli bio on CNBC.com
 Original speech by Rick Santelli on CNBC.com
 Santelli's speech and White House response

1956 births
Living people
American television reporters and correspondents
American business and financial journalists
American male journalists
University of Illinois Urbana-Champaign alumni
Drexel Burnham Lambert
People from Wheaton, Illinois
Tea Party movement activists
CNBC people
American people of Italian descent
Journalists from Illinois
Businesspeople from Chicago
People from Lombard, Illinois